Keijo Korhonen may refer to:

 Keijo Korhonen (politician) (1934–2022), Finnish politician, ambassador, and professor
 Keijo Korhonen (ski jumper) (born 1956), Finnish ski jumper